In organoboron chemistry, a carboryne is an unstable derivative of ortho-carborane with the formula B10C2H10. They are also called 1,2-dehydro-o-carboranes. The hydrogen atoms on the C2 unit in the parent o-carborane are missing.  The compound resembles and is isolobal with benzyne. A carboryne compound was first generated in 1990 starting from o-carborane. The hydrogen atoms connected to carbon are removed by n-butyllithium in tetrahydrofuran and the resulting lithium dianion is reacted with bromine at 0 °C to form the bromo monoanion.

Heating the reaction mixture to 35 °C releases carboryne, which can subsequently be trapped with suitable dienes:

such as anthracene (to afford a triptycene-like molecule) and furan in 10 to 25% chemical yield.

Carborynes react with alkynes to benzocarboranes  in an adaptation of the above described procedure. O-carborane is deprotonated with n-butyllithium as before and then reacted with dichloro-di(triphenylphosphino) nickel to a nickel coordinated carboryne. This compound reacts with 3-hexyne in an alkyne trimerization to the benzocarborane.

Single crystal X-ray diffraction analysis of this compound shows considerable bond length alternation in the benzene ring (164.8 pm to 133.8 pm) ruling out aromaticity.

See also 
 Heteroborane
 Organoboron chemistry

References 

Organoboron compounds
Cluster chemistry